Emil or Emile may refer to:

Literature
Emile, or On Education (1762), a treatise on education by Jean-Jacques Rousseau
Émile (novel) (1827), an autobiographical novel based on Émile de Girardin's early life
Emil and the Detectives (1929), a children's novel
"Emil", nickname of the Kurt Maschler Award for integrated text and illustration (1982–1999)
Emil i Lönneberga, a series of children's novels by Astrid Lindgren

Military
Emil (tank), a Swedish tank developed in the 1950s
Sturer Emil, a German tank destroyer

People
Emil (given name), including a list of people with the given name Emil or Emile
Aquila Emil (died 2011), Papua New Guinean rugby league footballer

Other
Emile (film), a Canadian film made in 2003 by Carl Bessai
Emil (river), in China and Kazakhstan

See also
 
 
Aemilius (disambiguation)
Emilio (disambiguation)
Emílio (disambiguation)
Emilios (disambiguation)